Alim Viktorovich Kumykov (born 18 April 1992) is a former Russian football player.

Club career
He made his professional debut in the 2011–12 Russian Cup for PFC Spartak Nalchik on 17 July 2011 in a game against FC Torpedo Vladimir.

Personal life
His father Viktor Kumykov is a football manager, and his older brother Artur Kumykov is a footballer.

References

1992 births
Living people
Russian footballers
Association football midfielders
PFC Spartak Nalchik players
Russian expatriate footballers
Expatriate footballers in Uzbekistan
Expatriate footballers in Kazakhstan